The Concord Fault  is a geologic fault in the San Francisco Bay Area. The reason it is called that is because it is located under the city of Concord. It is connected to, and considered to be part of, the same fault zone as the Green Valley fault, which lies just a few miles to the north across the Suisun Bay. The fault is situated at the east of West Napa Fault and extends from Mount Diablo to the Carquinez Strait, an approximately 11 mile long distance. Like most other faults in this area, the Concord Fault is a strike-slip fault, moving approximately 2.7 to 3.6 millimeters a year.

Seismic activity 

Currently, it is considered to be under a high stress level and therefore has a higher chance of a major earthquake happening. There have been earthquakes on this fault before. On October 23, 1955, a 5.4 magnitude quake caused about 1 million dollars in damage (about 8.7 million today) and one death. The last large earthquake linked to this fault occurred over 400 years ago.

Dangers 
According to USGS seismologists it is "the most urban fault" in the East Bay, with potential for a larger event than the 2014 South Napa earthquake. As critical infrastructure, including refineries that process a significant portion of the state's total crude oil, and a railroad bridge, lie under it, a major earthquake from it could leave the entire northern half of the state without fuel and disrupt transmission of electricity and water to some extent across the state. One particular pumping station, if hit by a quake, would particularly damage transmission of fuel. A major earthquake there could also cause flooding, which would impact drinking quality, and a loss of electricity.

References

Seismic faults of California
Geology of Contra Costa County, California
Concord, California
Mount Diablo
Geography of the San Francisco Bay Area